Cry Baby is the debut studio album by American singer and songwriter Melanie Martinez, released on August 14, 2015, through Atlantic Records. Between September and December 2012, Martinez rose to prominence upon participating in the third season of the American edition of The Voice. After the show's completion, the singer began working independently on original material, which she says she spent the majority of 2013 writing. 

The album was supported by the release of three singles. Four singles preceded the album's release: lead single “Dollhouse”, was released on February 9, 2014, “Carousel”, on October 15, 2014, "Pity Party", was released on June 2, 2015, and, "Soap", was released on July 10, 2015. The fifth and final single from the album, "Sippy Cup" was released July 31, 2015. Cry Baby is a visual concept album about a character named Cry Baby, who is a fantasy version of Martinez. 

Musically, Cry Baby is primarily an alternative pop, electropop, and indie pop record, and received generally positive reviews from critics. In the United States, the album was certified double-platinum by the Recording Industry Association of America, after earning 2 million album-equivalent units (sales, streaming, and track sales). In 2020, the song "Play Date", went viral on video-sharing platform TikTok, causing the album to re-enter charts globally.

Background and production
Martinez had an extended play completely done around 2013, which she began recording soon after she was eliminated from The Voice and was ready to put it out. However, after creating her song "Dollhouse" in September 2013, she decided not to release the aforementioned extended play. She began conceptualizing her debut album, which differed from the sound of the 2013 EP. In May 2014, Melanie put out her Dollhouse EP, and announced that summer that she hoped to have her album out around October. When October came, Melanie released the video for "Carousel" and postponed her release date for her album, and stated that she hoped to have it out in spring. That spring, Kinetics & One Love announced that all of the vocals for Melanie's album were finished, and Melanie officially announced that her album would be titled Cry Baby. Melanie began teasing some titles for tracks. The first single was "Pity Party" and was confirmed on May 27, 2015. The music video was accidentally leaked by Melanie herself on May 29, but she later tweeted that she was happy and excited for the fans who had seen it and promised there was "more to come" during her live stream on June 1. It was officially released on the day of the live stream. During the live stream, Martinez announced that the release day of Cry Baby would be in August. The second single, "Soap", was confirmed in late June, and it was announced soon before it was to be released on July 10. It leaked a day earlier. The one-shot music video came out the same day.

On July 16, the album art and release date were leaked on Amazon, although the release date was false. On July 17, the album art was officially revealed, and merchandise bundles were available to pre-order on Martinez's website, with the digital pre-order on July 24. Before the 24th, the track list of the album was leaked, although the websites that leaked it replaced "Tag, You're It" with "Jump Rope" and "Play Date" with "Half Hearted". The track list was officially revealed on the 24th with the pre-order. Starting on July 27, Melanie released a snippet of each song (apart from the ones on the deluxe edition) on her Instagram page. On July 28, Melanie released the snippet for "Sippy Cup" and announced that it would be released on July 31. On July 30, Spin premiered the video, and "Sippy Cup" was released the day after. The album was released on August 14. The CD was packaged as a storybook, with jewel case CDs available later. Both a picture disk and a standard black vinyl were released in the future. Cassettes were then released, advertised as being in yellow, blue, and pink. There is also a less common green cassette. All physical copies of the album are the standard explicit, with the deluxe and clean being digital exclusives.

Concept
The album is about a character, named Cry Baby, a fantasy version of Martinez when she was a very young child (specifically before she started education), and a representation of her vulnerable and messed-up side. Martinez described Cry Baby as "a child who experiences adult things". She states that many of the things that have happened to Cry Baby are embellished versions of things that have happened in her own life, except the part where Cry Baby gets kidnapped and kills her kidnapper. Each song on the tracklist has a childhood-related title and contains childhood-related metaphors, while the deeper messages being crossed to the listener carry more adult themes and problems. For example, the song "Cry Baby" refers to someone who is teased for openly displaying their emotions (as opposed to an actual baby), and the song "Training Wheels" is actually about taking a relationship to the next level. The storybook available in the pre-order bundle features rhymes and illustrations based on the album, written by Martinez herself.

Release
The album was released on August 14, 2015, by Atlantic Records, through digital download, CD, vinyl, and audio cassette. The vinyl and CD have special packaging, which includes a storybook that follows the album by illustrator Chloe Tersigni.
 Cry Baby debuted at number 6 on the Billboard 200 with 41,000 units sold in its first week; it also debuted at the top of the Alternative Albums Chart. It was announced on August 2, 2016, that the album had sold 263,050 copies. On February 24, 2017, the album was certified Platinum, having sold 1,000,000 copies in the US.

Singles
"Pity Party" was released as the first single. The music video was released on Vessel by Martinez on May 29, 2015, for early access users. It was then released three days later, on June 1, 2015, on YouTube. It was certified Platinum by RIAA.

"Soap" was released as the second single. It was released on July 10, 2015, along with a music video. It was certified Gold by RIAA. As of the end of 2017, "Soap" became an online trending song on the application TikTok (formerly known as Musical.ly), and a challenge known as the "Soap Challenge" gained speed, which saw users play Martinez's song while using liquid dish soap on makeup wipes to blow a stream of foam with their mouth.

"Sippy Cup" was released as the third single on July 31, 2015, with a music video. It was the darker sequel to the music video of her 2014 single, "Dollhouse".

Other songs
Martinez said in an interview that she would be releasing music videos for all tracks of the album. The song "Training Wheels" had a music video released on November 18, 2015, as a double-feature with a new video for "Soap", but "Training Wheels" was not announced as a single by Martinez. "Alphabet Boy" received a music video on June 2, 2016. A double feature music video for "Tag, You're It" and "Milk and Cookies" was released on August 23, 2016. The song "Pacify Her" had a music video released on November 15, 2016. The song "Mrs. Potato Head" had a music video released on December 1, 2016. The song "Mad Hatter" had its music video released on September 23, 2017, serving as the conclusion to the Cry Baby visual story.

In April 2020, Martinez's song "Play Date", one of the album's deluxe tracks, reached the "Viral 50" songs on Spotify and is subsequently rising on the charts. This resulted from a popular trend on TikTok, where users make an edit of a celebrity with the song playing in the background. Martinez posted on Instagram, addressing the song's success as the "best birthday present ever". On May 1, 2020, the song was certified Gold by RIAA and as of December 8, 2020 the song has been certified Platinum. In an interview with Idolator on May 8, 2020, Martinez revealed plans to record a music video for the song from home.

Critical reception
{{Album ratings
| rev1 = AllMusic
| rev1score = 
| rev2 = ABC News
| rev2Score = 
| rev3 = Billboard
| rev3Score = 
| rev4 = Outlet Magazine
| rev4Score = 
| rev5 = Popdust.com
| rev5Score = 4/5
| rev6 = Spin
| rev6Score = 8/10
| rev7 = Under the Gun Review
| rev7Score = 9.5/10
}}Cry Baby received generally positive reviews from music critics. Allan Raible at ABC News gave the album 4.5 stars out of 5, describing it as "a jarring, affecting record that will stick with you days after listening. It's not for passive listening. It is a rare pop record that is both catchy beyond belief and an artistic triumph." Jason Scott at Popdust.com described the album as "13 tracks of pure hypnotic bliss [that] tests the absolute bounds of alt-pop, puncturing and bleeding out of [Martinez's] Lesley Gore and Purity Ring influence," highlighting "Sippy Cup", "Mrs. Potato Head", "Soap", "Cry Baby" and "Alphabet Boy". AllMusic's Matt Collar compared Martinez to Björk and Beyoncé, and said that "her songs also fit nicely next to the work of contemporaries like Lorde and Lana Del Rey." Emma Guido at Under the Gun Review gave the album a 9.5 out of 10, calling the album "a journey with Martinez’s creepy alter ego as she battles her demons and obsessions", calling her songwriting methods "expressional, passionate and marvelously creative" and writing that "the haunted carnival-esque ambience of Cry Baby...takes on a new form of indie-pop music that the world has been waiting to hear."Spin named the album number 22 on their list of "The 25 Best Pop Albums of 2015".

Track listing

Notes
  signifies an additional producer.
 "Pity Party" samples Lesley Gore's "It's My Party", written by Wally Gold, John Gluck, Herb Wiener, and Seymour Gottlieb.

Personnel
 Melanie Martinez – vocals
Production
 Mitch McCarthy – mixing on all tracks except "Dollhouse", "Carousel" and "Pity Party" at Owl Foot Ranch
 Manny Marroquin – mixing on "Pity Party"
 Chris Gehringer – mastering
 JL Brown – mixing on "Training Wheels"

Charts

 Weekly charts 

 Year-end charts 

Certifications

 Release history 

Cry Baby's Extra Clutter EPCry Baby's Extra Clutter EP is the third extended play by American recording artist Melanie Martinez, released on November 25, 2016. The EP is a physical vinyl release and her first EP without a digital release of the three bonus tracks from Cry Baby'' as well as the limited-release 2015 Christmas single, "Gingerbread Man". The vinyl was only available for purchase via Urban Outfitters and Martinez's website. The EP's cover art was drawn by Chloe Tersigni.

Track listing

Release history

Tour

Set list 

 "Cry Baby"
 "Dollhouse"
 "Sippy Cup"
 "Carousel"
 "Alphabet Boy"
 "Soap"
 "Training Wheels"
 "Pity Party"
 "Tag, You're It"
 "Milk and Cookies"
 "Pacify Her"
 "Mrs. Potato Head"
 "Mad Hatter"
Encore
"Play Date"
 "Teddy Bear"
 "Gingerbread Man"
 "Cake"

Notes
 The songs that Martinez played as the encore was based on audience choice.
 The encore songs can be played in random order as Martinez likes, but Cake will always be the last song, except during the last shows in São Paulo, Buenos Aires, and Santiago (Cake was performed before Mad Hatter).
 Martinez decided to perform "Teddy Bear" after "Pity Party" in select shows.
 From March 26, 2017, to April 2, 2017, "Pacify Her", “Gingerbread Man”, and "Play Date" were removed from the setlist.

Shows

Notes

References

2015 debut albums
Synth-pop albums by American artists
Indie pop albums by American artists
Atlantic Records albums
Albums produced by Frequency (record producer)
Visual albums
Concept albums
Melanie Martinez (singer) albums
Albums produced by Jennifer Decilveo